The Suburban Times is an online newspaper in southwest Pierce County in Washington state, USA; serving the communities of Lakewood, University Place, Fircrest, Steilacoom, DuPont, and Joint Base Lewis-McChord.

Established in 2005, the focus of The Suburban Times is local, community news: government; business; schools and higher education; civic groups and community organizations; public safety and law enforcement; arts and entertainment; historical groups; community discourse (letters-to-the-editor); and other information impacting the communities served.

The newspaper is available on the web, in a daily e-mail edition, or by RSS.

References

External links 
 The Suburban Times

Internet properties established in 2005
American news websites
Mass media in Pierce County, Washington
Lakewood, Washington
Newspapers published in Washington (state)